McAuslan may refer to:

McAuslan Brewing, a brewery in Montreal, Quebec, Canada
Cameron McAuslan (born 1998), Hong Kong cricketer

See also
McAuslan in the Rough, a short story collection by George MacDonald Fraser